Diana Elizabeth Wilkinson (born 17 March 1944 in Stockport, Cheshire) is a retired British freestyle swimmer. She competed in the British Empire and Commonwealth Games from 1958 to 1966, the 1958 and 1962 European Aquatics Championships, and the 1960 and 1964 Summer Olympics.

Swimming career
She won five medals at the 1958 and 1962 European Aquatics Championships. She also participated in the 1960 and 1964 Summer Olympics.

Wilkinson was just 16 years old when she represented Great Britain at the 1960 Summer Olympics in the 100 metre freestyle, in the event she finished in third place in her heat and didn't qualify for the next round. Four years later she competed in two events at the 1964 Summer Olympics, she entered the 100 metre freestyle again and this time she finished fifth in her heat so didn't advance to the next round, she was also a part of the 4 × 100 metre freestyle relay team which finished last in there heat and didn't advance to the final.

She competed in four Commonwealth Games winning five medals. She represented England and won a bronze medal in the freestyle relay at the 1958 British Empire and Commonwealth Games in Cardiff, Wales.

Four years later she won a silver medal in the medley relay and a third consecutive bronze in the freestyle relay, at the 1962 British Empire and Commonwealth Games in Perth, Western Australia. Finally during the 1966 British Empire and Commonwealth Games in Kingston, Jamaica she won her final and fourth consecutive freestyle relay medal.

She is a four times winner of the British Championship in 100 metres freestyle (1961-1964) and the 200 metres freestyle in 1962.

Personal life
Her older brother is Christopher Wilkinson.

See also
 World record progression 4 × 100 metres medley relay

References

1944 births
Living people
British female swimmers
Swimmers at the 1960 Summer Olympics
Swimmers at the 1964 Summer Olympics
British female freestyle swimmers
Olympic swimmers of Great Britain
European Aquatics Championships medalists in swimming
Commonwealth Games medallists in swimming
Commonwealth Games gold medallists for England
Commonwealth Games silver medallists for England
Commonwealth Games bronze medallists for England
Universiade medalists in swimming
Swimmers at the 1958 British Empire and Commonwealth Games
Swimmers at the 1962 British Empire and Commonwealth Games
Swimmers at the 1966 British Empire and Commonwealth Games
Universiade silver medalists for Great Britain
Medalists at the 1965 Summer Universiade
Medallists at the 1958 British Empire and Commonwealth Games
Medallists at the 1962 British Empire and Commonwealth Games
Medallists at the 1966 British Empire and Commonwealth Games